East Los High is a teen drama streaming television series that revolves around the lives of a group of teens navigating their final years at a fictional high school in East LA. Created, written, and produced by Wise Entertainment, the series is Hulu's first and only series with an all Latino cast and crew and is predominantly filmed in East Los Angeles. The producers of the show work closely with numerous public health organizations to incorporate information within the storylines that encourage young Latinos to make healthy life choices.

On May 19, 2017, Hulu announced that East Los High would not be renewed for a fifth season. Hulu instead ordered an hour and half long series finale that aired on December 1, 2017.

Series synopsis

Season 1
The Series follows two teenage cousins, Jessie, a studious virgin, and Maya, a troubled runaway, who fall in love with Jacob, a popular football player. Maya and Jessie are forced to make real-life decisions as a result of this love triangle about social pressure, drugs, pregnancy, betrayal, and sex that will determine which of them will get the boy and have an impact on their lives for the rest of their lives. Ceci and Vanessa, two popular student and school bullies who make it their mission to intimidate any girls at East Los, but their choice in sexual partners cause them to face life-changing repercussions.

Season 2
When Ceci and Jacob return to East Los High School as coaches, the sex, passion, and mystery continue. A new generation of kids are risking everything for love in the hallways of East Los High, setting the stage for a sensational turn of events that will surely make this another breath-taking and exciting school year. But can they survive?

Season 3
Camila is forced to confront a horrific secret from her past. She runs the danger of losing both her life and her one true love in order to protect her sister Gina and boyfriend Nic. Meanwhile, when Ceci invites boys to join the Bomb Squad, the beautiful new team faces strong competition, but difficulties at home are far worse. Tiffany is affected by Deigo's actions. Maya and Jacob's love is put to the test by a once-in-a-lifetime opportunity. New and familiar faces appear and are drawn into the game.

Season 4
Summer break has arrived! The brand-new Bomb Squad departs for dance camp with seductive newcomers who entice romance both on and off the dance floor. As they seek to lead a life free of crime, Camila and Jesus rekindle their romance and face many challenges. Ceci decides to follow her goals, but discovers that reality is more challenging than she had anticipated. After secrets are uncovered and the family business is endangered in numerous ways, hearts are torn. This season, East LA streets are filled with danger while wedding bells ring, forcing the students to stand up for what they believe in. Someone will put everything on the line to battle for their future and true love, making this an unforgettable summer.

Season 5
As the season resumes a full year after the events of Season 4, it's the end of another school year. A journey of self-discovery and learning the true meaning of love, family, and friendship begins as the crew gets ready to leave high school and potentially even East L.A behind.

Cast and characters

Main 
 Vannessa Vasquez as Camila Barrios 
 Danielle Vega as Ceci Camayo
 Alexandra Rodriguez as Gina Barrios
 Gabriel Chavarria as Jacob Aguilar
 Carlito Olivero as Eddie Ramirez
 J. D. Pardo as Jesus
 Cinthya Carmona as Brandie
 Ade Chike Torbert as Caleb Summers
 Byron Martinez as Luis 
 Ray Diaz as Nicolas Reyes
 Janine Larina as Jessie Martinez (season 1)
 Vivian Lamolli as Filiberta "Fili" Rodriguez
 Rick Mancia as Diego Campos (season 2)
 Gillbert Saldivar as Santi
 Oskar Rodrigues as Omar
 Alicia Sixtos as Maya Martinez (season 1; recurring season 2–4)
 Tracy Perez as Vanessa De La Cruz (season 1; recurring season 2–4)
 Andrea Sixtos as Jocelyn Reyes (season 2-3; recurring season 4)
Ashley Campuzano as Tiffany Ramos (season 3; recurring season 4)

Recurring
 Ser Anzoategui as Daysi Cantu
 Noemi Gonzalez as Soli Gomez
 Hector David Jr. as Cristian Camacho
 Monica Guzman as Lupe Martinez
 Catalina Rodriguez as Paulina Martinez
 Jossara Jinaro as Reina Martinez
 Richard Azurdia as Ramon
 Jeremy Chavarria as Zac Bustamante 
 Chachi Gonzales as Jasmine
 Robert Paul Taylor as Remy
 Catherine Lazo as Ms. Alvarez
 Miguel Najara as José Reyes
 Gabrielle Walsh as Sofia
 Jes Meza as Lorena Barrios Aguilar
 Ruben Garfias as Hernan Aguilar
 Jorge Diaz as Paulie
 Vivis Colombetti as Rosario Reyes

Guest stars
Catalina Sandino Moreno as Carmen
Christina Milian as Lillian
Prince Royce as Vincent
Stephen "tWitch" Boss as himself
Vázquez Sounds as themselves
Chuey Martinez as himself
John DeLuca as Jeremy

Episodes

Series overview

Season 1 (2013)

Season 2 (2014)

Season 3 (2015)

Season 4 (2016)

Series Finale (2017)

Production
The first season of East Los High consisted of 24 episodes and was independently shot, produced, and edited before being picked up and licensed by Hulu. The show premiered in June 2013 and has become one of the platform's top 10 shows. In January 2014, Hulu announced that the series had been renewed for a second season, set to premiere in the summer of 2014. One week after the premiere of the new season, East Los High was renewed for its third season. On December 15, 2015, the series was renewed for a fourth season, marking it as Hulu's longest running original series.

Awards 
In 2016, East Los High was awarded the “Outstanding Online Series Award” from the National Hispanic Media Coalition.

References

External links
 
 East Los High
 Wise Entertainment

2010s American teen drama television series
2010s American high school television series
2013 American television series debuts
2017 American television series endings
Internet soap operas
2010s American LGBT-related drama television series
Lesbian-related television shows
Television shows set in Los Angeles
Hulu original programming
American teen drama web series
Television series about teenagers
Coming-of-age television shows